The Superior Person's Book of Words is a 1979 non-fiction book by Australian lexicographer Peter Bowler. It was first published in Australia as The Superior Person's Little Book of Words and has been subsequently re-published under its current title. The work collects several bizarre, obsolete and supposedly very useful words from the English language. Bowler followed the book up with five companion books, including the 2009 work The Completely Superior Person’s Book of Words. David R. Godine, Publisher has reported that the work is one of their best selling titles and sells between "25,000 to 30,000" copies a year.

References

Superior Person's Book of Words
Godine books
1979 non-fiction books